Ferreola may refer to:
 Ferreola (wasp), a wasp genus in the family Pompilidae
 Ferreola, a plant genus in the family Ebenaceae; synonym of Diospyros